Hirdesh Singh (born 15 March 1983), known professionally as Yo Yo Honey Singh or simply Honey Singh, is an Indian music producer, rapper, singer, songwriter and an actor. He started in 2003 as a session and recording artist, and became a bhangra and hip hop music producer. Later, he became successful with his songs and started making songs for Bollywood films.

Early life 
Hirdesh Singh was born in Karampura, New Delhi on 15 March 1983 into a Punjabi family to parents Sardaar Sarabjit Singh and Bhupinder Kaur. Singh's mother is from Hoshiarpur, Punjab and his father is a refugee, who moved and settled in New Delhi. Singh has a sister, Sneha Singh. He graduated from Guru Nanak Public School in the Pitampura neighbourhood of Punjabi Bagh, North West Delhi.

Career

Music
Singh prefers to sing in Hindi and his native language Punjabi rather than English.

The Punjabi album International Villager was released on 11 November 2011. The track "Gabru" from the album, featuring singer J-Star, topped the Asian music charts, including the official BBC Asian charts.

He has performed at many college festivals, including Ansal Institute of Technology and Ramjas College, Delhi.

Singh and Diljit Dosanjh's song "Lak 28 Kudi Da" reached number one in the BBC Asian Download Charts in May 2011. The song was released as a promotional track for Dosanjh's film Lion of Punjab.

Singh topped the chart of trending videos in 2012. He earned two places on YouTube's list of top 10 trending videos of 2012. His song "Brown Rang" made it to the top spot. "High Heels", in collaboration with Jaz Dhami, took the fourth spot.

Bollywood 
His debut song in Bollywood films was "Shakal Pe Mat Ja", featuring Gagan Sidhu. Singh charged Rs. 7 million for a song in the film Mastan. This was the largest amount paid to a song artist in Bollywood to date, making Singh one of the highest-paid musical artists in Bollywood.

The song "Angreji Beat" from Singh's album International Villager, featuring Gippy Grewal, was featured in Saif Ali Khan's film Cocktail.

Singh launched his single "Bring Me Back ft. Spoken Word" at the Video Music Awards India, which aired on MTV India. After the show, his song premiered on the channel.

In late 2013, he produced songs in the films Chennai Express and Boss. He has also had songs in smaller-budget films such as Mere Dad Ki Maruti, Bajatey Raho and Fugly.

In February 2015 he released the songs "Birthday Bash", followed by songs in films including Gabbar is Back and Bhaag Johnny. He suffered from bipolar disorder and took a long sabbatical from work. He returned in late 2018 with the song "Makhna". The same year he sang and composed songs for the movies Baazaar and Sonu Ke Titu Ki Sweety.

Mumbai Saga's first song "Shor Machega", was released on 28 February 2021. It was composed by Yo Yo Honey Singh, with lyrics and vocals by Singh and Hommie Dilliwala.

Acting 

Singh made his acting debut with Baljit Singh Deo's Punjabi film Mirza - The Untold Story (2012), performing the role of Deesha, a mad gangster. Despite only being a cameo appearance, the role went on to win Singh the PTC Punjabi Film Award for Best Male Debut. The following year, Singh appeared in another Punjabi film, this time a comedy by Amit Prasher, Tu Mera 22 Main Tera 22, as Rolly, a childish and spoilt brat, alongside Amrinder Gill. This was Singh's first main role in a film.

Singh then made his debut as an actor in Bollywood cinema with the 2014 musical-thriller film The Xpose, alongside Himesh Reshammiya. The film was released on 16 May 2014, to mixed reviews from critics, and was a box office flop.

In 2016, Singh starred in the Punjabi action film Zorawar, directed by Vinnil Markan, which was marketed as one of the most expensive Punjabi films to date. The film was critically acclaimed.

Criticism of lyrics 

In the aftermath of the 2012 Delhi gang rape case, the lyrics to some of his songs, which depict violence against women and rape positively, have caused controversy. A first information report (FIR) was lodged against Singh for his offensive lyrics, and a group of social activists filed an online petition demanding cancellation of his New Year performance at a Gurgaon hotel. After the campaign, Singh's New Year concert was cancelled by the hotel. Singh denies writing these offensive lyrics.

Singh's song "Party All Night" in Akshay Kumar's film Boss was at the centre of a controversy. Producers of the movie had to submit a petition in Delhi High Court claiming that they had 'muted' an alleged vulgar word in Singh's song. The court heard a petition filed by lawyer Sanjay Bhatnagar seeking a stay on the film, contending that without the censor board's approval, the song could not be released with such a vulgar word. The petitioner had sought a stay on the release of the film until either the word or the song was deleted from the film.

His work has been perceived as being vulgar, misogynist, promoting violence against women and a bad influence on youth. There have been reactions in print to Singh, such as from Annie Zaidi, who wrote  "An Open Letter to Honey Singh" in January 2013, and Sandipan Sharma, who wrote "Thanks for the crassness: An open letter to Honey Singh from a parent" in July 2014.

In 2014, Singh and fellow rapper Raftaar were in dispute over whether Raftaar should receive credit for the lyrics of the song "Yeh Fugly Fugly Kya Hai".

Personal life 
Singh married Shalini Talwar on 23 January 2011. Talwar has accused the rapper of multiple offenses under the Protection of Women from Domestic Violence Act. Delhi's Tis Hazari Court had also issued notice to the Singh and sought his response.

On 10 September 2022, The couple filed for a divorce, and Singh reportedly paid Rs. 1 crore as alimony.

Discography

Albums

Singles 
 Includes only those songs which feature Honey Singh in the song or video.

Appearances on film soundtracks

Production discography

Filmography

Awards 

2010 PTC Punjabi Best Music Director 2010 for the song "Desi Daroo"
2011 PTC Punjabi Best Music Director 2011 for album The Folkstar
2012 PTC Punjabi Best Music Director 2012 for album I.V. (International Villager)
2012 BritAsia TV Music Awards 2012 – Best International Act
2012 UK Asian Music Awards Best International Album 2012 for Album album I.V. (International Villager)
2012 PTC Punjabi Film Award –  Best Music Director 2012 for Mirza – The Untold Story
2012 PTC Punjabi Film Award – Best Debut (Male) for Mirza – The Untold Story
2013 MTV VMAI Awards – Best Indie Artist (male) 2013 for the song "Brown Rang"
2013 MTV EMA Awards – Best India Act 2013 for "Bring me Back"
 2013 BIG Star Entertainment Awards – Singh was co-winner of Most Entertaining Singer (Male), and "Lungi Dance" was nominated as Most Entertaining Song.
 2014 Zee Cine Awards 2014 for International Icon Male
 2014 Stardust Awards - Best Music Director for Yaariyan
 2016 Hindustan Times India's Most Stylish Awards - Most Stylish Singer
 2018 Mirchi Music Awards - Listener's Choice Album of the Year for Sonu Ke Titu Ki Sweety and Listener's Choice Song of the Year for "Dil Chori"

See also
An Open Letter to Honey Singh

References

External links 

 

 
Indian rappers
Punjabi rappers
Indian record producers
Living people
Singers from Delhi
Punjabi people
1983 births
People from Hoshiarpur
Punjabi-language singers
Indian folk-pop singers
21st-century Indian singers
MTV Europe Music Award winners